Lucas Silva may refer to:
 Lucas Silva (footballer, born 1980) (Lucas da Silva Lucas), Brazilian footballer
 Lucas Silva (footballer, born 1984) (Lucas Antônio Silva de Oliveira), Brazilian footballer
 Lucas Silva (footballer, born 1985) (Lucas Borges da Silva), Brazilian footballer
 Lucas Gomes da Silva, Brazilian footballer
 Lucas Silva (footballer, born 1993) (Lucas Silva Borges), Brazilian footballer
 Lucas Silva (footballer, born 1997) (Lucas Silva dos Santos), Brazilian footballer
 Lucas Silva (footballer, born 1998) (Lucas da Silva de Jesus), Brazilian footballer